Erin Azar (born ), also known as Mrs. Space Cadet, is an American runner and social media personality.

Azar began running after giving birth to her third child a few months earlier. She asked her followers to join her while she trained for a marathon as a "slightly overweight person who drinks too much beer" and an "expert struggle runner" on social media.

She swiftly gained popularity. As of November 2021, she had 696,300 followers and 26 million likes on TikTok. Azar competed in the New York City Marathon in 2021. As of November 2021, she had raised more than US$76,000 for the Michael J. Fox Foundation thanks to her popularity. She hopes to raise US$100,000 in total.

Early life 
Azar is from Kempton, Pennsylvania.

Social media career 
Azar started running a few months after giving birth to her third child. Her first goal was to run for 30 days. Her goal later increased to running a marathon within a year. She started documenting her runs online soon after starting running; she started on YouTube and later moved to TikTok in order to find a community for her to fit into. She made videos because she couldn't find any 'realistic running' videos online. On her social media, she invited her followers to join her, a "slightly overweight person who drinks too much beer" and "an expert struggle runner", as she trained for a marathon. She quickly became popular, and her first video has over 1 million views as of November 2021. She has 696,300 followers and 26 million likes on TikTok as of November 2021.

She hopes to eventually raise .

Running career 
Azar ran the 2021 New York City Marathon. She completed the course in 6 hours and 8 minutes. She decided to run in a marathon after seeing the 2021 New Jersey Marathon cancelled in August 2021.

Personal life 
She lives in Kutztown, Pennsylvania. She is married. She is a mother of three children.

Her father, Jim Gaffney, has Parkinson's disease. She left her marketing job in order to pursue running full-time.

References 

1980s births
Living people
American runners
American TikTokers
People from Berks County, Pennsylvania